Nusantara, officially the Capital City of Nusantara (IKN), is the future capital of Indonesia, set to be inaugurated on 17 August 2024, coinciding with the Indonesian Independence Day. Nusantara will replace Jakarta as the national capital, a position it has held since independence in 1945. Nusantara is expected to be formed as a new province splitting from East Kalimantan, similar to that of the capital region of Jakarta.

Construction of Nusantara began in July 2022, starting with land clearance and the construction of access roads. The first phase, the Government Central Area zone, consisting of government offices, schools, and hospitals, began construction the following month.Initially, 100,000 workers from across Indonesia were deployed to the Nusantara site in July 2022. However, this decision faced criticism from local mass organizations in East Kalimantan for not including enough local workers. In response to these concerns, President Joko Widodo instructed the Nusantara Capital City Authority to increase the workforce to between 150,000 and 200,000 to ensure the participation of local workers in the development of Nusantara.

Etymology 
The word nusantara is derived from Old Javanese. The Old Javanese word is a compound of nusa + antara, which can be roughly translated as 'the outer islands' (from Java island perspective), which initially refers to a translation of the region/archipelago's Sanskrit name Dvīpāntara (of the same meaning) given by Singhasari for the territories of the Majapahit empire that have since transformed and developed into modern-day Indonesia.

Based on local Kutainese oral tradition as recorded in the historical manuscript Salasilah Kutai, before the area was named as Kutai in 13th century, it was also called Nusentara.

History 
In April 2017, the Joko Widodo (Jokowi) administration considered moving the capital from Jakarta, with plans to finish assessing potential alternative sites for Indonesia's new capital by the end of 2017. According to an official from the Ministry of National Development Planning of Indonesia (Bappenas), the government was determined to move the Indonesian capital out of Java. Shortly after the plan was announced, Jokowi visited two alternative locations in Kalimantan, Bukit Soeharto in East Kalimantan and the Triangle Area near Palangka Raya in Central Kalimantan. In April 2019, a 10-year plan to transfer all government offices to a new capital city was announced. The National Development Planning Ministry recommended the three provinces of South, Central, and East Kalimantan that met the requirements for a new capital, including being relatively free from earthquakes and volcanoes.

On 23 August 2019, Jokowi submitted Presidential Letter No. R-34/Pres/08/2019, which was enclosed with two directives: (1) Presidential Study Report on Capital Relocation, and (2) Request on DPR Support for Capital Relocation. During his 2019 state of the union address at the parliament on 26 August, Jokowi announced the plan to relocate the capital to Kalimantan. Parts of Kutai Kartanegara Regency and Penajam North Paser Regency in East Kalimantan are to be carved out to create a new provincial-level planned city in a more central location within Indonesia. The plan is part of a strategy to reduce developmental inequality between Java and other islands in the Indonesian archipelago and to reduce Jakarta's burden as Indonesia's primary hub. The National Development Planning Ministry estimated the relocation cost to be  and that the government intended to cover 19% of the cost, the remainder coming mainly from public-private partnerships and direct investment by both state-owned enterprises and the private sector. At the same time,  will be allocated to saving Jakarta from sinking in the next decade.

In early September 2021, the bill for capital relocation was completed. On 29 September the same year, the Jokowi administration submitted an omnibus bill for the capital relocation to the People's Representative Council (the lower house of Indonesian legislature). Amongst many items prescribed in the bill, it contained the plan for the formation of a Capital City Authority, a special agency responsible to the new capital and answerable to the President. The new agency possesses ministry-like qualities in that the office holder would be appointed by the President, but with special governing capabilities akin to a provincial governor. It will also regulate how the Capital Authority will manage its funding, taxation, retribution, and assets.

Due to the plan being submitted in the middle of Jokowi's second term as president, the People's Consultative Assembly (MPR) re-issued the Constitution of Indonesia amendment to re-establish the MPR's ability to establish Principals of State Policies, similar to the New Order's MPR's State Policies Outline. This was to provide security and sustainability to the project and ensure its continuation after Jokowi was no longer in the presidency. Based on the results of the KedaiKOPI Survey Institute survey in August 2019, 95.7% of respondents from Jakarta expressed their rejection of the plan to move the capital city to East Kalimantan. On 17 January 2022, during a Special Committee Meeting, Minister of National Development Planning Suharso Monoarfa said the new nation's capital would be named Nusantara.

Following the inauguration of Bambang Susantono as chairman of the Authority, provinces across the country ceremonially send piece of soil and water from historically or culturally significant sites in their respective province to be part of the new capital's cornerstone and jug for its groundbreaking. Central Kalimantan brought pieces of soil from a hill where Tjilik Riwut, a national hero from the province and respected Dayak figure, was said to be meditating. East Kalimantan brought water and soil from Kutai Lama, where the historical Kutai Kartanegara kingdom was found. North Maluku brought a combination of soil and water from four main historical sultanates in Maluku, otherwise known as Maluku Kie Raha, which are Jailolo, Ternate, Tidore, and Bacan. East Nusa Tenggara province brought soil from seven regencies in the province, while Bengkulu brought soil from the location where Sukarno was exiled. South Kalimantan brought water and soil from former residences of respected ulemas in the province, Zainal Ilmi and Syekh Muhammad Al-Banjari. Southeast Sulawesi presented soil and water from the site of the historical Sultanate of Buton in Baubau. East Java also did a similar thing from sites of the former Majapahit Empire.

Design and construction 
The Ministry of Public Works and Public Housing organized a capital city design contest in late 2019. The winner,  ('Forest Archipelagic Country') by Urban+ was officially announced on 23 December 2019. The government undertook to collaborate on the design of the winning team with that of the second- and third-placed teams, as well as international designers, to sharpen the final design process up to 2020. Designers from at least three countries, namely China, Japan, and the United States, had offered to be involved in the design. The name, which had been suggested about three months earlier, is aligned with the winner's main concept. 

The city is designed for sustainability, targeting 80% of mobility to be supported by public transport, cycling, or walking. Surrounded by the forests of Kalimantan, it will draw all of its energy from renewable sources, allocating 10% of its area to food production.

Construction was delayed until after the COVID-19 vaccination campaign completed in March 2022.

In March 2022, the Ministry again organized a design contest on four structures, namely the vice-presidential palace, the legislatures' office complex, the judiciary's office complex, and a complex set for public worship next to Lake Pancasila.

Geography 

Nusantara is situated on the east coast of Borneo, the world's third largest island. The city shares land border with the province of East Kalimantan and has the coastal line in the east to Makassar Strait and in the south to Balikpapan Bay. The city features a hilly landscape and was formerly an industrial forest whose concession was owned by Sukanto Tanoto.

Zoning 

Nusantara metropolitan area will include the surrounding East Kalimantan regencies and cities, such as Balikpapan and Samarinda.

Government 

Nusantara is managed by a corporation named the Nusantara Capital City Authority. Its formation is different from other cities in Indonesia, as those were considered autonomous, self-governing settlements which are separate from the central government. Meanwhile, the Capital Authority is a corporation directly answerable to the central government, a ministry-level agency and its head a cabinet-level official. Unlike governors, the Head and Deputy Head of the Capital City Authority are directly elected and appointed by the President, not through the regional election, so they just elect the President, the House of Representatives (DPR), and the Regional Representative Council (DPD).

Since 10 March 2022, the authority has been headed by chairman Bambang Susantono and assisted by vice chairman Dhony Rahajoe.

Transportation 
To achieve the target for 80% of mobility supported by non-private transportation, an extensive network of public transportation in the new capital is planned. The city puts an emphasis on dense, walkable development and will be served by a citywide network of cycling paths, a metro system consisting of two rail lines, a bus rapid transit system, and autonomous minibuses acting as feeder service.

An airport rail service will connect the new capital to the existing Sultan Aji Muhammad Sulaiman Sepinggan Airport in Balikpapan, along with a commuter rail network to serve Balikpapan and Nusantara. A new intercity and regional rail system will be constructed to connect the new capital with the neighboring cities of Samarinda (Samarinda International Airport) and Balikpapan as part of the larger plan for a Trans Kalimantan Railway network connecting the entire Indonesian side of Borneo Island with rail service.

A new airport located in Penajam, will serve as the primary international airport to Nusantara.

Nusantara will also be served by the neighboring Aji Pangeran Tumenggung Pranoto Airport located at Samarinda, the neighbouring city of the new capital, and Balikpapan's Sultan Aji Muhammad Sulaiman Sepinggan Airport.

See also 
 Capital of Indonesia — Historical capital cities of Indonesia
 Nusantara (archipelago) – Indonesian name of Maritime Southeast Asia
 Wawasan Nusantara — National vision of Indonesia
 List of purpose-built national capitals

Notes

References

External links 

 

Government of Indonesia
2024 beginnings
Politics of Indonesia
Planned capitals
Capital districts and territories
Provinces of Indonesia
Capitals in Asia
Borneo